R Apodis (R Aps) is a star in the constellation Apus.

R Apodis is an orange K-type giant with an apparent magnitude of +5.34.  It is approximately 386 light years from Earth.  It was earlier suspected to be a variable star and given the variable star designation R Apodis. Now it is confirmed as a non-variable.

R Apodis has exhausted its core hydrogen fuel and left the main sequence. Despite being cooler than the sun, its large size means it emits 229 times more electromagnetic radiation.

References

131109
Apus (constellation)
K-type giants
Apodis, R
5540
073223
CD-76 688
J14575300-7639454
IRAS catalogue objects